Novoyegoryevsky (masculine), Novoyegoryevskaya (feminine), or Novoyegoryevskoye (neuter) is the name of several rural localities in Russia:
Novoyegoryevskoye, Altai Krai, a selo in Yegoryevsky District of Altai Krai
Novoyegoryevskoye, Nizhny Novgorod Oblast, a village in Knyagininsky District of Nizhny Novgorod Oblast